Magnus Haglund (born 15 April 1973) is a Swedish football coach and former player. He is currently the manager of Halmstads BK. He has previously managed IF Elfsborg and Lillestrøm SK, having signed a two-year contract starting in January 2012. In 2006, he led IF Elfsborg to its first league title in 45 years with Peter Wettergren.

Honours

Manager
IF Elfsborg
Allsvenskan: 2006

References

1973 births
Living people
Swedish footballers
Halmstads BK players
Swedish football managers
IF Elfsborg managers
Lillestrøm SK managers
Halmstads BK managers
Allsvenskan managers
Eliteserien managers
Swedish expatriate football managers
Expatriate football managers in Norway
Swedish expatriate sportspeople in Norway
Association football goalkeepers
Sportspeople from Halmstad
Sportspeople from Halland County